Argentinian footballer Lionel Messi, widely regarded as one of the greatest players of all time, has received seven Ballon d'Or awards, the most for any football player, as well as the 2009 FIFA World Player of the Year, and the 2019 and 2022 The Best FIFA Men's Player. Messi holds the record for most goals in La Liga (474), the Supercopa de España (14), the UEFA Super Cup (3) and is the player with the most official recorded assists in football history (353). He has scored 799 goals for club and country throughout his professional career and is also the first and only player in history to win five and six European Golden Shoes.

Collective awards

Friendly titles 
 Joan Gamper Trophy: 2006, 2007, 2010, 2011, 2013, 2014, 2015, 2016, 2017, 2018, 2019, 2020
 Ramón de Carranza Trophy: 2005
 Franz Beckenbauer Cup: 2007
 Tournoi de Paris: 2012
 Summer of Champions' Cup: 2012
 International Champions Cup: 2017 United States
Nelson Mandela Trophy: 2018
Riyadh Cup: 2023

Friendly competitions 
 Copa Times of India: 2011
 Superclásico de las Américas: 2017, 2019
 San Juan Cup: 2019

Individual honours

Selections for the best player or forward

World 
Awards ceremonies to crown the best player of the world have been organized annually since 1955, when the inaugural Ballon d'Or awarding took place. The Ballon d'Or was presented to the player who had been voted to have performed the best over the previous year, and was established by French journalist Gabriel Hanot. Originally, votes could only be awarded to European players before a 1995 rule change.

The FIFA World Player of the Year was established in 1991.

FIFA Ballon d'Or

Ballon d'Or

FIFA World Player of the Year

The Best FIFA Men's Player

FIFA World Cup Golden Ball

FIFA Club World Cup Golden Ball

Other 
 Copa América Best Player: 2015, 2021
 Copa América Best Young Player: 2007
 FIFA U-20 World Cup Golden Ball: 2005
 Onze d'Or: 2009, 2010–11, 2011–12, 2017–18 
 Onze d'Argent: 2008, 2016–17, 2018–19, 2020–21
 ESPN Best Forward: 2014, 2015, 2016, 2017, 2018, 2019, 2020, 2021
 ΕΘΝΟΣΠΟΡ Best Footballer of the Year: 2009
 World Soccer Player of the Year: 2009, 2011, 2012, 2015, 2019, 2022
 FourFourTwo Best Footballer of the Year: 2009, 2010, 2011, 2012, 2015, 2017, 2018, 2019
 The Guardian Best Footballer in the World: 2012, 2013, 2015, 2017, 2019, 2022
 Goal 50: 2008–09, 2010–11, 2012–13, 2014–15, 2020–21, 2021–22
 Globe Soccer Awards Best Player of the Year: 2015
 FIFPro Young Player of the Year: 2006, 2007, 2008
 IFFHS World's Best Player: 2022
 IFFHS World's Best Man Player of the Decade: 2011–2020
 IFFHS Best Player of CONMEBOL: 2020, 2021, 2022
IFFHS The Best Man CONMEBOL Player of the Decade: 2011–2020
 World Soccer Young Player of the Year: 2006, 2007, 2008
 Greatest Player of the 21st Century by The Independent: 2019 
Greatest Player of the last 25 years by FourFourTwo: 2020 
Best Player of the Year by 433 (The Ring award): 2021 

 Shortlisted for Golden Foot: 2016, 2017, 2018, 2019, 2020, 2021

Europe

UEFA Men's Player of the Year Award 

According to UEFA, the award "recognise[s] the best player, irrespective of his nationality, playing for a football club within the territory of a UEFA member association during the previous season." Players are judged by their performances in all competitions, domestic and international, and at club and national team levels throughout the season.

In the past, the award was solely decided by a panel of 53 leading sports journalists. In 2018, however, UEFA added 80 coaches, from the clubs that participated in the group stages of that year's UEFA Champions League and UEFA Europa League, to its jury. The amount of journalists selected by the European Sports Media association was also increased to 55, representing each of UEFA's member associations.

Champions League Forward of the Season 
Champions League positional awards were introduced in 2017 to "recognise the season's best player in each position in Europe's premier club competition".

Other 
 UEFA Club Footballer of the Year: 2008—09
 UEFA Club Forward of the Year: 2008–09, 2018–19
 Champions League Player of the Week: MD5/2015–16, MD1/2016–17, MD3/2016–17, MD5/2016–17, R16/2017–18 (2nd leg), MD1/2018–19, MD2/2018–19, MD5/2018–19, MD10/2018–19, MD11/2018–19
 Nominated for the UEFA Player of the Week: 8/2016
 El País European Player of the Year: 2009, 2010, 2011, 2012
 Golden Boy Award: 2005 
 Bravo Award: 2007
 JOE's Champions League Man of the Week: 45/2014, 48/2014 19/2015

Spain

La Liga Awards 

 La Liga Best Player: 2008–09, 2009–10, 2010–11, 2011–12, 2012–13, 2014–15
 La Liga Best Forward: 2008–09, 2009–10, 2010–11, 2011–12, 2012–13, 2014–15, 2015–16
La Liga Player of the Month: January 2016, April 2017, April 2018, September 2018, March 2019, November 2019, February 2020, February 2021

Other 
 Trofeo Alfredo Di Stéfano: 2008–09, 2009–10, 2010–11, 2014–15, 2016–17, 2017–18, 2018–19
Don Balón Award: 2006–07, 2008–09, 2009–10
Trofeo EFE: 2007, 2009, 2010, 2011, 2012
 Mundo Deportivo Trofeo MVP La Liga: 2017–18, 2018–19

Barcelona
 Trofeo Aldo Rovira: 2009–10, 2010–11, 2012–13, 2014–15, 2016–17, 2017–18
 Joan Gamper MVP Award: 2013, 2014, 2016, 2018
 Barça Players Award: 2015–16

France

Ligue 1 Awards 
 UNFP Player of the Month: September 2022

Goalscoring

European Golden Shoe 

The European Golden Shoe is awarded to the top goalscorer in Europe. It is awarded based on a weighted points system that allows players in tougher leagues to win even if they score fewer goals than a player in a weaker league. Goals scored in the top five leagues according to the UEFA coefficients rankings are multiplied by a factor of two, and goals scored in the leagues ranked six to 21 are multiplied by 1.5.

Since the points system was established in 1996, Messi is the only player to win the award a record six times and also the only one to win it with a record 100 points (season 2011–12). Messi was also the first player to win the award five times.

UEFA Champions League top scorer

All-time 

Cristiano Ronaldo is the UEFA Champions league all-time top goalscorer with 140 goals while Messi is second with 129 to his name. The pair had broken each other's record over the course of 2015, after Messi surpassed the previous recordholder, Raúl, in November 2014. Ronaldo opened a gap in the 2015–16 season when he became the first player to score double figures in the group stage of the Champions League, setting the record at 11 goals.

La Liga top scorer

All-time

Hat-tricks

4 5

Other performances 
Some of these accolades are shared with other players.

 Top goalscorer
 IFFHS World's Best Global Goal Scorer: 2012, 2016
 IFFHS World's Best Top Division Scorer: 2012, 2013, 2017, 2018 
 IFFHS World's Best International Goal Scorer: 2011, 2012, 2022
 Copa del Rey: 2008–09, 2010–11, 2013–14, 2015–16, 2016–17
 FIFA Club World Cup: 2011
 FIFA U-20 World Cup Golden Shoe: 2005
 Copa América Top Scorer: 2021
 Copa América Silver Boot: 2016
FIFA World Cup Silver Boot: 2022

IFFHS World's Best National Goal Scorer of the Decade: 2011–2020

 Goal of the tournament 
 The best goal of the Champions League according to fans: 2018–19
 Best goal in the group stage of Champions League: 2022–23
 Best goal in the quarter-final stage of Champions League: 2018–19
 Best goal in the semi-final stage of Champions League: 2018–19
 Copa América Best Goal: 2007
 Champions League Goal of the Season: 2019–20
 UEFA/UEFA.com Goal of the Season: 2014–15, 2015–16, 2018–19

 Nominated for FIFA Puskás Award: 2010, 2011, 2012, 2015, 2016, 2018, 2019

 Top assist provider
 UEFA Champions League: 2011–12, 2014–15
 La Liga: 2010–11, 2014–15, 2015–16, 2017–18, 2018–19, 2019–20
 Copa del Rey: 2011–12, 2013–14, 2014–15, 2015–16, 2016–17, 2017–18
 FIFA Club World Cup: 2011
 CONMEBOL–UEFA Cup of Champions: 2022
 Copa América: 2011, 2015, 2016, 2021
 FIFA World Cup: 2018, 2022

Inclusions for team of the season or tournament

International 
Awarded by international football federations

 FIFA FIFPRO World 11: 2007, 2008, 2009, 2010, 2011, 2012, 2013, 2014, 2015, 2016, 2017, 2018, 2019, 2020, 2021, 2022
 UEFA Team of the Year: 2008, 2009, 2010, 2011, 2012, 2014, 2015, 2016, 2017, 2018, 2019, 2020
UEFA Ultimate Team of the Year
 UEFA Champions League Squad of the Season: 2014–15, 2015–16, 2016–17, 2017–18, 2018–19, 2019–20, 2020–21
 UEFA Champions League Player Rater Team of the Season: 2009–10, 2010–11, 2011–12
 UEFA Champions League Player Rater Team of the Week: MD1/2010–11, MD8A/2010–11, MD10/2010–11, MD11/2010–11, MD12/2010–11
 FIFA World Cup Dream Team: 2014
 Copa América Dream Team: 2007, 2011, 2015, 2016, 2021
 AFA Team of All Time
 IFFHS Men's World Team: 2017, 2018, 2019, 2020, 2021, 2022
IFFHS Men's CONMEBOL Team: 2020, 2021, 2022
IFFHS Team of The CONMEBOL Copa América: 2021

Other
 Ballon d'Or Dream Team: 2020
11Leyendas Jornal AS: 2021
 IFFHS All-time World Men's Dream Team
 IFFHS All-time South America Men's Dream Team
 IFFHS Argentina Men's Dream Team
 IFFHS Men's CONMEBOL Team of The Decade: 2011–2020
ESM Team of the Season: 2005–06, 2007–08, 2008–09, 2009–10, 2010–11, 2011–12, 2012–13, 2014–15, 2015–16, 2016–17, 2017–18, 2018–19, 2019–20, 2020–21
 L'Équipe Team of the Year: 2008, 2009, 2010, 2011, 2012, 2013, 2014, 2016, 2017, 2018, 2022
World Soccer Greatest XI of all time
Sports Illustrated Team of the Decade: 2000s
France Football Team of the Decade: 2010s

Spain 
La Liga Awards

Selections for international sports personality of the year 
Laureus World Sports Award for Sportsman of the Year

The Laureus World Sports Awards is an annual award ceremony honouring remarkable individuals from the world of sports along with the greatest sporting achievements throughout the year. With six and five nominations respectively, Messi and Ronaldo are the only footballers to be nominated on multiple occasions. In 2020, Messi became the first footballer to win the award.

Others
 L'Équipe International Athlete of the Year: 2011, 2022
 Best International Athlete ESPY Award: 2012, 2015, 2019
ESPY Awards International Footballer of the Year: 2019
 Marca Leyenda: 2009
 Best Athlete in Latin America and the Caribbean: 2014
Champion for Peace and Sport: 2020
 BBC World Sport Star of the Year: 2022
 International Sports Press Association (AIPS) – Best Male Athlete of the Year: 2022

Selections for national sports personality of the year 
Argentine Athlete of the Decade (2011–2020)
 Diamond Konex Award: 2020
Argentine Sportsperson of the Year
 Olimpia de Oro: 2011, 2021, 2022
Argentine Footballer of the Year
 Olimpia de Plata: 2005, 2007, 2008, 2009, 2010, 2011, 2012, 2013, 2015, 2016, 2017, 2019, 2020, 2021, 2022

Man of the match awards 

UEFA Champions League Final

UEFA Super Cup

FIFA Club World Cup Final

2010 FIFA World Cup

2011 Copa América

2014 FIFA World Cup

2015 Copa América

Copa América Centenario

2018 FIFA World Cup

2019 Copa América

2021 Copa América

2022 Finalissima

2022 FIFA World Cup

Other 
 IFFHS World's Best Playmaker: 2015, 2016, 2017, 2019, 2022
IFFHS World's Best Playmaker of the Decade: 2011–2020
IFFHS World's Best Playmaker of 2006–2020

 Nominated for the Laureus World Sports Award for Breakthrough of the Year: 2006
 Nominated for the Eurosport Emotional Moment of the Year: 2016

Records

World records
 Most FIFA World Player of the Year/FIFA Ballon d'Or/Best FIFA Men's Player Awards: 7 (2009–2012, 2015, 2019, 2022)
 Most Ballons d'Or: 7 (2009–2012, 2015, 2019, 2021)
 Most consecutive Ballons d'Or: 4 (2009–2012)
 Youngest two-time, three-time, four-time, five-time, six-time and seven-time Ballon d'Or winner: aged 23, 24, 25, 28, 32 and 34 years old
 Largest gap between first and last Ballon d'Or awards: 12 years (2009-2021)
 First player to win the FIFA World Player of the Year/FIFA Ballon d'Or/Best FIFA Men's Player Award in three different decades: 2000s, 2010s, 2020s
 First player to win the Ballon d'Or in three different decades: 2000s, 2010s, 2020s
 Guinness World Record for top goalscorer for club and country in a calendar year (official goals): 91 goals in 2012
 Most official goals for a single club: 672, for Barcelona
 Most recorded assists for a single club: 268, for Barcelona
 Most trophies won with a single club: 35, with Barcelona
 Most goals in a calendar year (including club friendlies): 96 in 2012
 Most goals in all club competitions in a calendar year: 79 in 2012
 Most goals in a club season: 73 in 2011–12
 Most goals scored in a domestic league: 474, in La Liga
 Most assists provided in a domestic league: 192, in La Liga
 Most goals scored in a domestic league in a single season: 50 in 2011–12
 Most assists provided in a domestic league in a single season: 21 in 2019–20
 Most goals contributions in finals: 49 (34 goals and 15 assists)
 Most goals in Finals: 34
 Most Assists in Finals: 15
 Longest goalscoring run in a domestic league: 21 matches, 33 goals in 2012–13
 Only player to have won more than one FIFA World Cup Golden Ball: 2014 and 2022
 Oldest player to win FIFA World Cup Golden Ball: aged 35 years and 178 days, in 2022
 Only player to have won more than one FIFA Club World Cup Golden Ball: 2009 and 2011
 First player to have won more than one FIFA Club World Cup Final Most Valuable Player award: 2009 and 2011
 Only player to score 40+ goals in 12 consecutive seasons
 Only player to score 30+ goals in 13 consecutive seasons
 Only player to score in seven different official competitions in a single calendar year: 2015, in La Liga, the Copa del Rey, UEFA Champions League, Copa América, UEFA Super Cup, Supercopa de España and FIFA Club World Cup (completed on 20 December 2015)
 Only player to score in six different club competitions in a calendar year twice: 2011 and 2015
 Only player to score and assist in six different club competitions in a calendar year: 2011
 Only player to score 60+ goals in all competitions in 2 consecutive seasons: 2011–12 and 2012–13
 First player to score consecutively against all teams in a professional league: 2012–13
 Most appearances in the FIFPRO World 11: 16 (2007–2022)
 Most (official) assists provided in football history: 353
 Most appearances at the FIFA World Cup finals: 26 (3 in 2006, 5 in 2010, 7 in 2014, 4 in 2018, 7 in 2022)
 Most appearances at the FIFA World Cup finals as captain: 19 (1 in 2010, 7 in 2014, 4 in 2018, 7 in 2022)
 Most minutes played at the FIFA World Cup finals: 2,314
 Most FIFA World Cup matches scored in: 11
 First player to score in all five rounds of a FIFA World Cup (group stage, round of 16, quarter-final, semi-final, final): 2022
 Most Man of the Match awards won in a single FIFA World Cup: 5, in 2022
 Only player to score in his teens, his twenties and his thirties in the history of the World Cup
 Most assists provided at the FIFA World Cup: 8 (1 in 2006, 1 in 2010, 1 in 2014, 2 in 2018, 3 in 2022)
 Most assists provided in the knockout phase of the FIFA World Cup: 6 (1 in 2010, 1 in 2014, 2 in 2018, 2 in 2022)
 Only player to provide at least one assist in four and five different World Cup tournaments and most consecutive World Cup tournaments with at least one assist: 2006, 2010, 2014, 2018 and 2022
 Most Player of the Match awards won at the World Cup finals: 11 (1 in 2010, 4 in 2014, 1 in 2018, 5 in 2022)
 Most total dribbles completed at the World Cup finals: 125
 Most goal contributions at the World Cup: 21
 Most goals at major international tournaments: 26 (13 goals at FIFA World Cup, 13 goals at Copa América)
 Most goal contributions at international tournaments' knockout matches: 27
 Most goal contributions at major international tournaments: 51 (13 goals and 8 assists at FIFA World Cup, 13 goals and 17 assists at Copa América)
 Only player to win a 'Best Player/Golden Ball' award at all official tournaments participated in (FIFA U-20 World Cup, FIFA World Cup and Copa América)

Continental records

Europe
 Most European Golden Shoe awards: 6 (2010, 2012–2013, 2017–2019)
 Most consecutive European Golden Shoe awards: 3 (2017–2019)
 Most goals scored in Europe's top 5 leagues: 700, in La Liga and Ligue 1
 Fastest player ever to reach 300 goals in Europe's top 5 leagues: in 334 matches
 Fastest player ever to reach 400 goals in Europe's top 5 leagues: in 435 matches
 Most goals scored for a single club in the UEFA Champions League: 120 for Barcelona
 Fastest player to reach 100 UEFA Champions League goals: in 123 matches
 Most goals scored in a European Cup/UEFA Champions League match: 5, against Bayer Leverkusen on 7 March 2012
 Most goals scored in a European Cup/UEFA Champions League quarter-final match: 4, against Arsenal on 6 April 2010
 Most hat-tricks scored in the UEFA Champions League: 8
 Most goals scored in the UEFA Champions League group stage: 80
 Most goals scored in the UEFA Champions League round of 16: 29
 Most goals scored in a UEFA Champions League round of 16 tie: 6, against Bayer Leverkusen in 2011–12
 Most different opponents scored against in UEFA Champions League history: 40
 Most goals in the UEFA Super Cup: 3
 Most appearances in the UEFA Champions League Squad of the Season: 7 (2015–2021)
 Most appearances in the ESM Team of the Season: 13 (2006, 2008–2013, 2015–2020)
 Most UEFA/UEFA.com Goal of the Season awards: 3 (2014–15, 2015–16, 2018–19)
 First player to win the UEFA/UEFA.com Goal of the Season award for two consecutive seasons: in 2014–15 and 2015–16
 First player to score in 15 and 16 consecutive seasons of the UEFA Champions League
 Youngest player to make 100 appearances in the UEFA Champions League: aged 28 years, 84 days
 Youngest player to score 50 goals in the UEFA Champions League: aged 24 years, 285 days
 Youngest player ever to score 400+ goals for a single European club: aged 27 years and 300 days, for Barcelona
 Most dribbles completed in a UEFA Champions League match: 16, against Manchester United on 29 April 2008

Americas
 Most international goals scored by a male CONMEBOL player: 98
 Most appearances in the Copa América: 34
 Most assists in the Copa América: 17 (1 in 2007, 3 in 2011, 3 in 2015, 4 in 2016, 1 in 2019, 5 in 2021)
 Most assists in a Copa América tournament: 5, in 2021
 Only player to provide at least one assist in five and six different Copa América tournaments: 2007, 2011, 2015, 2016, 2019 and 2021
 Most assists in CONMEBOL qualification matches for the World Cup: 10
 Most goals scored by a substitute in a Copa América match: 3, against Panama on 10 June 2016
 Most Man of the Match awards won in Copa América matches: 14 (2 in 2011, 4 in 2015, 3 in 2016, 1 in 2019, 4 in 2021)
 Most Copa América Best Player awards: 2 (2015 and 2021)

Spanish records
 Most Best Player in La Liga awards: 6 (2009–2013, 2015)
 Most Best Forward in La Liga awards: 7 (2009–2013, 2015–2016)
 Most La Liga Player of the Month awards: 10 (January 2016, April 2017, April 2018 May 2018, September 2018, March 2019 May 2019, November 2019, February 2020, February 2021)
 Most Pichichi Trophies: 8 (2010, 2012–2013, 2017–2021)
 Top goalscorer in La Liga: 474 goals
 Top assist provider in La Liga: 192 assists
 Top goalscorer in the Supercopa de España: 14 goals
 Most Supercopa de España finals scored in: 7
 Most goals scored in a La Liga season: 50 in 2011–12
 Most assists in a La Liga season: 21 in 2019–20
 Most braces scored in La Liga: 116
 Most hat-tricks scored in La Liga: 36
 Most hat-tricks scored in a La Liga season: 8 in 2011–12
 Most teams scored against in a season: 19 in 2012–13
 Most La Liga appearances by a foreign player: 520 matches 
 Only player to score consecutively against all opposition teams in La Liga: 19 matches, 30 goals in 2012–13
 Most league home goals in a season (38 matches, 19 home matches): 35 in 2011–12
 Most league away goals in a season (38 matches, 19 away matches): 24 in 2012–13
 Most league matches scored in a season (38 games): 27 in 2012–13
 Most league home matches scored in a season (38 games): 16 in 2011–12
 Most league away matches scored in a season (38 games): 15 in 2012–13
 Most different opponents scored against in La Liga history: 38
 Most consecutive away league matches scored in: 13 (20 goals from matchday 8 to matchday 33 in 2012–13)
 Only player to be top goalscorer and top assist provider in the same season: 2018–19 and 2019–20
Most stadiums scored at: 38
 First player to score in 15, 16 and 17 consecutive seasons 
 Only player to score 20+ goals in 10, 11, 12 and 13 consecutive seasons
 Only player to score 30+ goals in 7 different seasons
 Only player to score 10+ goals in 13, 14 and 15 consecutive seasons (from 2006–07 to 2020–21) 
 First player to reach 300 La Liga goals
 First player to reach 350 La Liga goals
 First player to reach 400 La Liga goals
 First player to reach 450 La Liga goals
 First player to reach 150 La Liga assists
 Youngest player to score 200 goals in La Liga: aged 25 years and 7 months
 Most La Liga titles won by a non-Spanish individual: 10 (all with Barcelona)
 Most La Liga victories: 383
 Most appearances in a Copa del Rey final: 10 (2009, 2011, 2012, 2014, 2015, 2016, 2017, 2018, 2019, 2021)
 Most Copa del Rey finals scored in: 7 (2009, 2012, 2015, 2017, 2018, 2019, 2021)
 Most assists provided in Copa del Rey finals: 6 (1 in 2009, 2 in 2016, 1 in 2017, 2 in 2018)
 Most dribbles completed in a La Liga match: 15, against Real Betis on 4 November 2007
 Most dribbles completed in a Copa Del Rey match: 23, against Villarreal on 31 January 2008
 Most goals scored from direct free kicks in La Liga: 39

 Most goals scored in La Liga in a calendar year: 59 goals in 2012

Argentine records
 Most caps for Argentina: 172
 Argentina all-time top goalscorer: 98 goals
 Top goalscorer for Argentina in a calendar year: 18 goals in 2022
 Only Argentina player to score against every CONMEBOL nation
 Youngest player to play for Argentina in a FIFA World Cup: aged 18 years and 357 days in 2006
 Youngest player to score for Argentina in a FIFA World Cup: aged 18 years and 357 days, against Serbia and Montenegro in 2006
 Youngest player to captain Argentina in a FIFA World Cup: aged 22 years and 363 days in 2010
 Youngest player to reach 100 caps for Argentina: aged 27 years and 361 days in 2015
 Most appearances at the FIFA World Cup finals: 26 (3 in 2006, 5 in 2010, 7 in 2014, 4 in 2018, 7 in 2022)
 Most goals scored overall in FIFA World Cup finals: 13 (1 in 2006, 4 in 2014, 1 in 2018, 7 in 2022)
 Most goals scored in a single FIFA World Cup qualification campaign: 10 in the 2014 World Cup qualifiers
 Most goals scored overall in FIFA World Cup qualification matches: 28
 Most goals scored in competitive games: 54
 Most goals scored in international friendlies: 44
 Most direct free kick goals scored in all international competitions, including friendlies: 9
 Most hat-tricks scored in all international competitions, including friendlies: 8
 Most assists provided in all international competitions, including friendlies: 53
 Most Man of the Match awards won in a single FIFA World Cup: 5, in 2022
 Most Man of the Match awards won in FIFA World Cup matches: 11 (1 in 2010, 4 in 2014, 1 in 2018, 5 in 2022)
 Most Copa América tournaments played in: 6 (2007, 2011, 2015, 2016, 2019, 2021)
 Most FIFA World Cup tournaments played in: 5 (2006, 2010, 2014, 2018, 2022)
 Most FIFA World Cup tournaments scored in: 4 (2006, 2014, 2018, 2022)
 Most FIFA World Cup tournaments with an assist: 5 (2006, 2010, 2014, 2018, 2022)

Club records

Barcelona
 Top goalscorer in El Clásico: 27 goals
 Most assists in El Clásico: 14 assists
 Top goalscorer in the Derbi barceloní: 25 goals
 Top goalscorer in the Athletic–Barcelona clásico: 29 goals
 Top goalscorer in official competitions: 672 goals
 Top goalscorer including friendlies: 709 goals
 Top goalscorer in the UEFA Champions League: 120 goals
 Top goalscorer in European competitions: 123 goals
 Top goalscorer in international competitions: 128 goals
 Most hat-tricks scored in all competitions: 48
 First player to be top goalscorer in four, five, six, seven and eight La Liga seasons (2009–10, 2011–13, 2016–21)
 Most matches won with the team: 542
 Most La Liga matches won by a Barcelona player: 383
 Most home goals scored in a single season in all competitions: 46 in 2011–12
 Most goals scored from a free kick in official competitions: 50
 Most appearances in official competitions: 778
 Most appearances in La Liga: 520
 Most appearances in the Copa del Rey: 80
 Most trophies won as a Barcelona player: 35
 Most assists as a Barcelona player in all competitions: 268

Other records
 Most World Soccer Player of the Year awards: 6 (2009, 2011, 2012, 2015, 2019, 2022)
 Most World Soccer Young Player of the Year awards: 3 (2006–2008)
 Most The Guardian Best Footballer in the World wins: 6 (2012, 2013, 2015, 2017, 2019, 2022)
 Most FourFourTwo Best Footballer of the Year awards: 8 (2009–2012, 2015, 2017–2019)
 Most Trofeo Alfredo Di Stéfano wins: 7 (2008–09, 2009–10, 2010–11, 2014–15, 2016–17, 2017–18, 2018–19)
 Most Trofeo Aldo Rovira wins: 6 (2009–10, 2010–11, 2012–13, 2014–15, 2016–17, 2017–18)
 Most Trofeo EFE awards: 5 (2007, 2009–2012)
 Most Onze d'Or awards: 4 (2009, 2010–11, 2011–12, 2017–18)
 Most goals scored in Joan Gamper Trophy: 9 (2 in 2011, 1 in 2013, 1 in 2014, 1 in 2015, 2 in 2016, 1 in 2017, 1 in 2018)
 Most Man of the Match awards in Joan Gamper Trophy: 4 (2013, 2014, 2016, 2018)
 Most IFFHS World's Best Playmaker awards: 5 (2015–2017, 2019, 2022)
 Most IFFHS World's Best Top Division Goal Scorer awards: 4 (2012, 2013, 2017, 2018)
 Most appearances in the IFFHS Men's World Team: 6 (2017–2022)
 Most appearances in the Copa América Dream Team: 5 (2007, 2011, 2015, 2016, 2021)
 Most ESPN Best Forward awards: 8 (2014–2021)
 Only footballer to have won at the Laureus World Sports Awards: 2020
 Most nominations for the FIFA Puskás Award: 7 (2010–2012, 2015, 2016, 2018, 2019)

See also 
 List of international goals scored by Lionel Messi
 List of FC Barcelona records and statistics
 List of career achievements by Cristiano Ronaldo
 Messi–Ronaldo rivalry

Footnotes

References 

Messi, Lionel
Career achievements